June beetle is the common name for several scarab beetles that appear around June in temperate parts of North America:

In subfamily Cetoniinae:
Cotinis nitida (Green June beetle) of the southeastern United States
Cotinis mutabilis (Figeater beetle) of the western and southwestern United States

In subfamily Melolonthinae:
Amphimallon solstitiale (European June beetle, summer chafer) of Europe (and other species of Amphimallon )
Melolontha (cockchafers or May bugs) of Europe
Phyllophaga (May beetles) of the Americas
Polyphylla decemlineata (Ten-lined June beetle) of the western United States and Canada.
Rhizotrogus marginipes (and other species of Rhizotrogus )

See also
June bug (disambiguation)